Mykhaylo Serhiyovych Shershen (born 27 April 1995) is a Ukrainian football defender who plays for Metalist 1925 Kharkiv.

Career
Shershen is a product of the different youth sportive schools.

In 2012 he signed contract with Ukrainian FC Zorya Luhansk and played in the Ukrainian Premier League Reserves until 2017, with the break, during 2015–2016, when Shershen went on loan in the Ukrainian Second League club FC Kremin Kremenchuk. After return from loan he was promoted in March 2017 to the main-squad team of FC Zorya in the Ukrainian Premier League.

He made his debut as a start-squad player for Zorya in the Ukrainian Premier League in a match against FC Shakhtar Donetsk on 6 May 2017.

References

External links
 
 

1995 births
Living people
Ukrainian footballers
Association football defenders
FC Zorya Luhansk players
FC Kremin Kremenchuk players
FC Kramatorsk players
FC Metalist 1925 Kharkiv players
Ukrainian Premier League players
Ukrainian First League players
Ukrainian Second League players
Kharkiv State College of Physical Culture 1 alumni